Firoza, or Feroza is a populated town in Rahim Yar Khan in the center of Khanpur-Liaqatpur the tehsils of Rahim Yar Khan, Punjab, Pakistan. Its original name (with diacritics) is Firoza. This city is named after Raja feroz Khan Janjua . He  owned it's mostly area about 300 acres of land in 1980's .

History
The town developed around the railway station. There are many stories about the name of the town. But the most popular among people is that it is named by the English after a woman who was the first resident of the area. It is said that she served them well and they named the place after her as a reward for her services. Another famous story is that it is named because of the stone found there called Firoza. But this does not seem a likely one as now there is no sign of any such stone. Because it's named after Raja Feroz Khan Janjua, who owned mostly land area in the 1980s.

Geography 
Khanpur is in South West, Liaquatpur in North East, PakkaLaran is in North West and Cholistan is in East of Firoza.

People and culture
People living here belong from two different origins. One who are called Riasti belong to this region. Second, are those who migrated from different regions of the Indian subcontinent after 1947. Now, the culture of the region is a true symbol of cultural harmony.  Most People here wear shalwar-qameez but Dhoti-kurta is also used by older fellows while the young generation wears Western clothes. Shilwar-qameez is the only dress code adopted by women. Women here used to wear dupattas. Most women used to have a veil. Islamic culture is still dominant among women. Villagers also use turbans.

Major tribes
The main tribes of the town are the Rais, Chachar, Jam, Lar, Jhargi, Warraich, Syed, Bukhari, Chauhan, Chaudhry, Qureshi, Chandia Baloch, Alvi, Thaheem, Hashmi, Malik, Mughal, Raja, Kharal, Dushti Baloch, Mazari Unner, Jamali Baloch, Mirza, Gujjar, Dasti Baloch, Khawaja, Mian, Sheikh, Bohors, Mahar, Rahmani, Bhatti, Baloch, Jat, Bhullar, Khosa Baloch, Khushk Baloch, Abbasi, Malik, Jatoi Baloch, Asari, Oad, Rajput, Mirani, Raos, Khokhar, Patafi, Palals, Kewad, Dhareja, Jat Warah, Korai Baloch, Panwar, Bhutta, and Soomro. Most of the tribes resident in the town have belonged to this region for centuries. Still, a number of migrant families also are living here. These migrant families mostly belong to the Indian subcontinent.

Religion 
The town has majority of Muslim sects. Hindus and Christians are in minority amounting to less than 2% of total population. In this region, minorities are usually treated with equal rights as the minorities are living with majority of Muslims since centuries.

Education
The literacy rate is quite low because of the non-availability of resources. There is only one private college and two higher secondary schools. There are government-run secondary schools within the town, as well as private schools. Still, many people are in well-known departments because of their own struggles.

One of the oldest educational institutions of Firoza is Govt. Higher Secondary School Firoza (for boys). It was built in 1926 by the British Government as a primary school. After that, it was given the designation of secondary school in 1939. After Pakistan came into being this school started progressing at a pace. So, the government announced it as high secondary school in 1952. From 1952 to 1988 it remained a high school. Then, with the efforts of many notable people, it was given the designation of Higher Secondary School. Now, it is working as a higher secondary school. The school has experienced ups and downs, but it has given many notable people to the nation. The school is now suffering from problems like inadequate building where the number of students is increasing day by day.

The first private school was Oxford Public Girls High school started on 1 January 1992. Another educational institute is Tamir-E-Millat Model Public High School Firoza which was established by Rana Mohammad Hussain in 2000.

There are other private institutions as well. But all of the above-mentioned schools are not up to the standard regarding facilities. Children here are unable to get quality education. With all those difficulties the region has produced some brilliant minds who lifted themselves from scratch.

Religious Schools

Many religious institutes called madrasas are working here. The oldest is named Madrasa Arabia Madina tul aloom, and was established in 1950 by Syed Ibn ul Hassan, a retired bureaucrat of Pakistan Railways. After his death his older son Molana Syed Hamid Ali expanded it into  an institution where hundreds of students received religious education. Later on, other religious schools for basic Islamic education were established in different corners of the town namely, Madni Mosque, Madarsat-ul-banat,  Faizan-e-Madina, etc. Different school of thoughts are working according to their ideologies. Number of Hafiz (Qur'an) are increasing by the work of these Islamic institutes.

Climate 
Firoza is considered to have a desert climate. In Firoza, there is virtually no rainfall during the year. This location is classified as BWh by Köppen and Geiger. The average temperature in Firoza is 25.7 °C. The rainfall here averages 122 mm.

The least amount of rainfall occurs in November. The average in this month is 1 mm. Most of the precipitation here falls in July, averaging 38 mm. The temperatures are highest on average in June, at around 35.3 °C. January is the coldest month, with temperatures averaging 13.1 °C. The variation in the precipitation between the driest and wettest months is 37 mm. Throughout the year, temperatures vary by 22.2 °C.

Industry and commerce
Most of the people are directly or indirectly related to agriculture. This area is renowned for cotton and mango crops. Rest of them are related to trade and government employment. Trade is the fastest-growing occupation/profession here because people from the nearby villages are investing here. Specially, people are shifting from villages of Cholistan Desert to Firoza.

Souvenirs are produced in the city, some of which include:

 Flassi - 4 ft by 7 ft, made of camel hair and cotton yarn; it is used for wall hanging, as a decoration piece and a carpet.
 Gindi or Rilli - Made of small pieces of many colors of cotton cloth and needlework; they can be used as wall hangings, bed covers, carpets and blankets.
 Changaries - Like big plaques, these are made of palm leaves in different bright colors with beautiful patterns and geometric designs. These are used for keeping the 'chapattis' and also as a wall decoration.
 Khalti - Like a purse embroidered on top with multicolored threads.
Artwork - An attractive type of embroidery done on dupatta, kurta and chaddar, etc.

Health

The city has only one government run hospital. The hospital lacks basic life-saving medicines and facilities. To facilitate the people of the town and suburbs of the town few private hospitals are working. People here are lacking proper health facilities. It is not only a dilemma of this city, it is common to the whole region. Basic health necessities are rare in the town. Drinking water of the town is unhygienic, having plentiful salt making it undrinkable. The only source of drinking water is handful water pumps on the brink of a canal just outside the town in South East direction.

Sports
Popular sports are cricket, kabaddi, kushti, and football. Some of the other local games are gulli danda, ghoribella, bandar killa, kut mar, goch no teal, and andress press.

Tomb
It is said that there was an attack by non-Muslims that killed 22 Hafiz (Qur'an) and their teacher, Baba Bavi. Their tombs are located in the main graveyard of town. The main graveyard is in north of town. People here go to attend the religious activities.

See also
Derawar Fort
Saraiki people
Rahim Yar Khan

References

Rahim Yar Khan District